Leo W. Fraser, Jr. (December 8, 1926 – August 9, 2013) was an American lawyer, businessman, and politician.

Born in Boston, Massachusetts, he served in the United States Marine Corps 1944–1946. He then received his degree from Northeastern University and his law degree from the New England School of Law. He was a claim adjuster in Boston. In 1970 he moved to Pittsfield, New Hampshire, serving as the New Hampshire Insurance Commissioner. In 1976 he established Fraser Financial Services in Pittsfield. A Republican, he served in the New Hampshire House of Representatives from 1985 to 1991 and then in the New Hampshire State Senate from 1991 to 2002. He died in Concord, New Hampshire.

References

1926 births
2013 deaths
Lawyers from Boston
People from Pittsfield, New Hampshire
Northeastern University alumni
New England Law Boston alumni
Massachusetts lawyers
New Hampshire lawyers
Businesspeople from Boston
Republican Party New Hampshire state senators
Republican Party members of the New Hampshire House of Representatives
20th-century American politicians
State insurance commissioners of the United States
20th-century American businesspeople
20th-century American lawyers